Royal Arctic Line A/S (RAL) or Royal Arctic is a seaborne freight company in Greenland, wholly owned by the Government of Greenland. It was formed in 1993, and is headquartered in Nuuk.

History
Royal Arctic Line A/S was spun off as a company separate from the Greenlandic conglomerate KNI in 1993. Like many Greenlandic companies, its operations derive from and carry on the traditions of the earlier Royal Greenland Trading Department.

Operations
The company has a monopoly on all sea transport of cargo to, from, and within Greenland. Construction materials account for roughly a quarter of shipping to Greenland; fish makes up roughly half of shipping from Greenland; fish and beverages bottled at Nuuk (principally water and beer) account for most shipping within Greenland.

Royal Arctic operates cargo routes among the Greenland settlements and between Nuuk and Aalborg in Denmark and manages 13 harbors in Greenland as well as the Greenlandic base harbour in Aalborg, which serves as the source for all European shipping to the island. Seaborne traffic from North America goes to Reykjavík aboard Eimskip, whence it is carried to Greenland aboard Royal Arctic.

In 2011, government concessions accounted for 76% of the company's income. The Transport Committee newly formed by the Greenland Home Rule government issued a report stating that liberalisation of the shipping market offers no benefits and the current concession is reasonable. It also began planning with RAL and stakeholders to expand the harbors in Nuuk and Sisimiut.

Divisions

Linietrafik (Line Traffic)
Royal Arctic Linietrafik operates the company's fleet, currently consisting of ten ships  six container ships and four "settlement ships"  with five more under construction.

The three largest ships  the Naja Arctica (782 Twenty-foot equivalent unit (TEU)), Nuka Arctica (782 TEU), and Mary Arctica (588 TEU)  are principally used for the Aalborg route. The Irena Arctica (424 TEU), Arina Arctica (283 TEU), and Pajuttaat are used within Greenland and have equipment for unloading in cities without harbors. All these container ships are double-hulled and built with high freeboards and the highest ice ratings: the Mary Arctica has even been chartered for Antarctic service. The settlement ships Angaju Ittuk, Anguteq Ittuk, Aqqaluk Ittuk, and Johanna Kristina are all older and smaller (220–320 m³) and used for supplying the smaller ports. In 2011, the ships had an average on-time rate of 72%.

One of the new ships is considered Mary-class and will have a capacity of 606 TEU. Of the four others, two will have 108-TEU and two will have 360-TEU capacity.

Linietrafik Container Ships

Linietrafik Settlement Ships

Havneservice (Portservices)
Royal Arctic Havneservice operates the company's harbour operations and nearby lighthouses.

 Aarhus (Denmark)
 discontinued: Aalborg (Denmark)
 Aasiaat (April–December)
 Ilulissat (April–December)
 Maniitsoq
 Nanortalik
 Narsaq
 Nuuk (home port of Royal Arctic Line)
 Paamiut
 Qaqortoq
 Qasigiannguit (April–December)
 Sisimiut
 Tasiilaq (July–October)
 Upernavik (June–November)
 Uummannaq (June–November)
Some other towns such Qaanaaq, Pituffik, Kangerlussuaq, Ittoqqortoormiit and stations in Northeast Greenland National Park in Greenland are served only once to three times per year. Reykjavík in Iceland is served every three weeks on runs to South Greenland and Nuuk and on most trips to East Greenland.

Subsidiaries

Royal Arctic Line Denmark
Royal Arctic Line Denmark A/S is a wholly owned subsidiary based in Aalborg.

Logistics
Royal Arctic Logistics A/S is a wholly owned subsidiary based in Aalborg. It operates the Aalborg harbour and the forwarding business between Greenland and Denmark. Its subsidiaries include the Aalborg Stevedore Company A/S (67%), Nordjysk Kombi Terminal A/S (50%), and Aalborg Toldoplag A/S (40%).

Arctic Umiaq

Arctic Umiaq Line A/S is a wholly owned subsidiary of the Royal Arctic Line and based in Nuuk. It operates one passenger ferry, Sarfaq Ittuk, among communities along the western coast of Greenland. Its 2011 operating loss of DKK 8.1 million was made good via a loss guarantee from Greenland Home Rule, and the company has secured an agreement for further loss guarantees through 2016.

Arctic Base Supply
Arctic Base Supply A/S is owned jointly (50% each) with Danbor and based in Nuuk. It provides logistical support for offshore oil and gas exploration and, in 2011, assisted Cairn Energy in its work at Nuuk and Aasiaat. No activity is expected in 2012, however.

Ejendomsselskabet Suliffik
Ejendomsselskabet Suliffik A/S ("Suliffik Property Co.") is a subsidiary (30.3%) owned jointly with Royal Greenland (30.3%) and TELE Greenland (39%).

References

Transport companies established in 1993
Shipping companies of Greenland
Transport in Nuuk
Companies based in Nuuk